Astraeus koreanus is a species of false earthstar in the family Diplocystaceae. Described as a new species in 1976, it is found in Korea. The species was originally named as a variety koreanus of Astraeus hygrometricus in 1958.

References

External links

Boletales
Fungi described in 1958
Fungi of Asia